Masterpiece is a 1962 pop art painting by Roy Lichtenstein that uses his classic Ben-Day dots and narrative content contained within a speech balloon. In 2017 the painting sold for $165 million.

Background
According to the Lichtenstein Foundation website, Masterpiece was part of Lichtenstein's first exhibition at Ferus Gallery in Los Angeles from April 1 – April 27, 1963, featuring Drowning Girl, Portrait of Madame Cézanne and other works from 1962 and 1963. When discussing another work (I Know...Brad), Lichtenstein stated that the name Brad sounded heroic to him and was used with the aim of clichéd oversimplification. Drowning Girl is another notable work with Brad as the heroic subject.

The source of this image was a comic book panel with the two subjects positioned similarly to their position here, but they were situated in an automobile. In the source image the narrative content of the speech balloon said "But someday the bitterness will pass..."

Masterpiece was part of the largest ever retrospective of Lichtenstein that visited The Art Institute of Chicago from May 16 to September 3, 2012, the National Gallery of Art in Washington, D.C. from October 14, 2012 to January 13, 2013, the Tate Modern in London from February 21 to May 27, 2013 and The Centre Pompidou from July 3 to November 4, 2013. Several publications presented Masterpiece as part of their announcement of the retrospective.

In January 2017, Agnes Gund sold the 1962 painting Masterpiece, which for years hung over the mantle of her Upper East Side apartment, for $165 million. The proceeds of the sale will be used to start a fund for criminal justice reform called the Art for Justice fund. The price was one of the 15 highest ever to be paid for an artwork. The purchaser was Steven A. Cohen.

Critical response
Masterpiece is regarded as a tongue in cheek joke that reflects upon Lichtenstein's own career. In retrospect, the joke is considered "witty and yet eerily prescient" because it portended some of the future turmoil that the artist would endure. In the painting,  the blonde female's speech bubble, "Why, Brad darling, This painting is a masterpiece! My, soon you'll have all of New York clamoring for your work!" conveys her remark as she gazes at the painting, of which a corner of the back is shown. Silent Brad conveys his agreement by his facial expression. Adrian Searle of The Guardian says that the 1962 work, whose narrative and graphical content were both borrowed, was timely because Lichtenstein had his first exhibition in New York City at Leo Castelli Gallery that year, making the painting aspirational in an ironic way that comments on success and "the socio-sexual status of the hot young artist". The satirical commentary on Lichtenstein's career, followed the inside joke made the year before in Mr. Bellamy. According to Roberta Smith of The New York Times, Masterpiece was one of Lichtenstein's works created in a way that produced "faint and uneven" Ben Day dots.

See also

 1962 in art
 List of most expensive paintings

Notes

References

External links
 Lichtenstein Foundation website
 Masterpiece - Original Artist : Ted Galindo

1962 paintings
20th-century portraits
Paintings by Roy Lichtenstein
Portraits by American artists
Paintings about painting